The 2017 East Sussex County Council election took place on 4 May 2017 as part of the 2017 local elections in the United Kingdom. All councillors were to be elected from electoral divisions by first-past-the-post voting for a four-year term of office.

Boundary changes to the electoral divisions will take effect at this election after a review of the county by the Local Government Boundary Commission for England.  This has led to an increase in the size of the Council from 49 to 50 and the splitting of former multi-member divisions.

Results
The Conservatives took control of the council, with all UKIP's seats lost. Labour had a 3-seat loss, and the Liberal Democrats took 2 seats.

Election results

|}

Eastbourne

Devonshire

Hampden Park

Langney

Meads

Old Town

Ratton

St Anthony's

Sovereign

Upperton

Hastings

Ashdown and Conquest

Baird and Ore

Braybrooke and Castle

Central St Leonards and Gensing

Hollington and Wishing Tree

Maze Hill and West St Leonards

Old Hastings and Tressell

St Helens and Silverhill

Lewes

Chailey

Lewes

Newhaven and Bishopstone

Ouse Valley West and Down

Peacehaven

Ringmer and Lewes Bridge

Seaford North

Seaford South

Telscombe

Rother

Battle and Crowhurst

Bexhill East

Bexhill North

Bexhill South

Bexhill West

Brede Valley and Marsham

Northern Rother

Rother North West

Rye and Eastern Rother

Wealden

Alfriston, East Hoathly & Hellingly

At the previous election the UKIP candidate polled 29.4%

Crowborough North and Jarvis Brook

Crowborough South and St Johns

Forest Row and Groombridge

At the previous election this seat also had UKIP and Labour candidates, who polled 28.9% and 5.7% respectively.

Hailsham Market

Hailsham New Town

Heathfield and Mayfield

Maresfield and Buxted

Pevensey and Stone Cross

Polegate and Watermill

Uckfield North

Uckfield South with Framfield

At the last election the UKIP candidate polled 32.2%.

Wealden East

Wealden North East

Willingdon and South Downs

|-
| || colspan=4 | Independent hold

References

2017
2017 English local elections
2010s in East Sussex